LocalWiki is a collaborative project that aims to collect and open the world's local knowledge.  The LocalWiki project was founded by DavisWiki creators Mike Ivanov and Philip Neustrom  and is a 501(c)(3) nonprofit organization based in San Francisco, California. LocalWiki is both the name of the project and the software that runs the project's websites.

History
In 2004, Ivanov and Neustrom started DavisWiki, an experimental project to collect and share local information about the town of Davis, California, editable by anyone. It became a large and active community wiki. According to its founders, at least half of the local residents use it. The LocalWiki project aims to provide "institutional memory" and context for local news. LocalWiki is built on the Django framework in Python.

In June 2010, LocalWiki won a $350,000 grant from the Knight News Challenge. After winning the grant to develop the software, they ran a Kickstarter project to raise $25,000 to help fund outreach, which was successful.

In December 2011, the project announced its first "focus community", Denton, Texas. Its second focus community was the Triangle region of Durham, North Carolina, with initial contributions about transportation infrastructure and parks, and a goal of compiling information about historic events. A nonprofit in Tallahassee, Florida helped start TallahasseeWiki with knowledge from residents. The LocalWiki project for Oakland, California is supported by volunteers meeting in person to collaborate on historical information.

In 2012 the LocalWiki team assembled a comprehensive high-definition map of the Antarctic continent, available on "Open Antarctica", a LocalWiki instance for Antarctica.  Neustrom explained that the map was "pieced together from very-hard-to-find NASA aerial imagery and coastline datasets".

In April 2015, Idmloco focused on Davis LocalWiki as part of a public relations operation for U C Davis chancellor Linda P.B. Katehi.

Functionality 
The LocalWiki software includes a WYSIWYG editing interface to help make editing simpler. It also includes mapping features: each article can have an associated annotated map, and the website has an overview map with those annotations.

Notable LocalWiki communities

As of 2013, major LocalWiki communities include Santa Cruz County, California; Oakland, California; Raleigh-Durham, North Carolina; Denton, Texas; Ann Arbor, Michigan; and Tokyo, Japan.

See also

 Citizen journalism
 Code for America
 DavisWiki
 OpenStreetMap
  and list of Regiowikis
 Wikipedia
 Wikimedia Foundation

References

External links
 Official LocalWiki website
 LocalWiki repository on Github

Collaborative projects
Creative Commons-licensed websites
Organizations based in San Francisco
Wikis
English-language websites
Spanish-language websites
Content management systems
Internet properties established in 2004